Henri II d'Orléans, duc de Longueville or Henri de Valois-Longueville (6 April 1595 – 11 May 1663), a legitimated prince of France (of royal descent) and peer of France, was a major figure during the Fronde, and served as governor of Picardy, then of Normandy.

Life
He was the only son of Henri I d'Orléans, duc de Longueville and Princess Catherine Gonzaga.

As an opponent of Concini and favorite of the regent Marie de Médici, he joined the plot mounted by Henry II of Bourbon-Condé, during which his forces occupied the city of Peronne. In 1619, he gave the duchy of Picardy to Louis XIII's favorite, Charles d'Albert, duc de Luynes, obtaining in exchange that of Normandy. In the summer of 1620, he joined the revolt of Marie de Medici, but the Parliament of Rouen and the city of Dieppe, which he besieged, remained loyal to the king. Longueville was suspended from his duties for a few months.

Longueville headed the French delegation in the talks that led to the Treaty of Westphalia which ended the Thirty Years War (1648). During the peace proceedings, his insistence on being called Altesse, added to the conflict regarding ambassadorial titles.

In his role as sovereign prince of Neuchâtel, and acting as antagonist of the Habsburg power rather than as liberal benefactor, he succeeded in obtaining formal exemption from the Holy Roman Empire for all cantons and associates of the Swiss Confederacy.

In 1642 he married Anne Geneviève de Bourbon; his brother-in-law was Louis II de Bourbon, Prince de Condé, leader of the aristocratic party in the Fronde. After the Peace of Rueil (11 March 1649) had ended the first phase of the civil war, Mazarin's sudden arrest of the Grand Condé, his brother the prince de Conti and their brother-in-law the duc de Longueville, on 14 January 1650 precipitated the next phase of the Fronde, the Fronde des nobles.

Family
He married his first wife Louise de Bourbon in Paris on 10 April 1617, their children were:
 Marie (1625–1707), who married Henri II, Duke of Nemours
 Louise (1626–1628)
 X (1634–1634)

After his first wife's death, he married Anne Geneviève de Bourbon in 1642, their children were:
 Charlotte Louise, Mademoiselle de Dunois (1644–1645)
 Jean Louis Charles d'Orléans, Duke of Longueville (1646–1694)
 Marie Gabrielle (1646–1650)
 Charles Paris d'Orléans, Duke of Longueville (1649–1672).

Notes

References

Sources

External list 
 Liste des ducs de Longueville

1595 births
1663 deaths
Dukes of Longueville
17th-century peers of France
Princes of Neuchâtel